Nuuk Airport (is an airport serving Nuuk, the capital of Greenland. The airport is a technical base and focus city for Air Greenland, the flag carrier airline of Greenland, linking the capital with several towns in western and south-western part of the country, including the airline hub at Kangerlussuaq Airport. With connections to Iceland, Nuuk Airport is also one of six international airports in Greenland but serves only destinations within Greenland and Iceland. International connections are made with flights to either Keflavík International Airport in Iceland or Kangerlussuaq Airport.

In the early 1960s, seaplanes of the newly established Air Greenland landed in Nuuk Port. In 1965, the airline invested in developing a more robust fleet based on the large Sikorsky S-61 helicopter, which continued to serve the town for the next four decades, even after the construction of an airport in Nuuk capable of serving the short takeoff and landing (STOL) de Havilland Canada Dash 7 aircraft, which have been predominant since the 1970s.

The airport was constructed to serve the largest town in Greenland, yet due to space constraints at the location in a mountainous area and problems with the weather, it is unable to service large airliners or flights reaching Denmark or other countries, except for Iceland. Sometimes, in connection with events, aircraft for VIP flights are chartered which unable to reach Nuuk, a change to a small local aircraft (normally at Kangerlussuaq Airport) is always needed in those cases. A large expansion of the airport has been controversial due to the approach near the urbanized area of the outlying districts of Nuuk, although the issue continues to be a subject of internal debate in Greenland.

A new international airport is slated for completion in 2024.

Geography

The former suburbs of Nuuk, such as Nuussuaq, Quassussuup Tungaa, and Qinngorput, incorporated into the town in the last decade, have brought the city closer to the airport. There is an alpine ski course only  from the airport terminal.

History

Seaplane era
In the early 1960s, after the establishment of Air Greenland on 7 November 1960 as Grønlandsfly, Nuuk was served exclusively by the PBY Catalina flying boat, with the aircraft using the waterways of the Nuuk Port as a landing site. In 1962 a PBY Catalina crashed near the port, killing 15 people on board.

Helicopter era

The tragedy was one of the factors leading to the decision to invest in a helicopter fleet. The Sikorsky S-61N machines—still in use in 2010—proved to be a more reliable mode of transport for the city, providing exclusive service for the Nuuk city for more than a decade—from the purchase date in 1965 until the late 1970s.

Even in the later era of the fixed-wing, turboprop plane domination, the S-61N helicopters continued to link Nuuk with the smaller town of Paamiut, until the airport was built there in 2007, replacing the old heliport.

Regional airport network
Nuuk Airport was built in 1979, when the then newly formed home rule government decided to create a network of the STOL-capable domestic airports. The airport in the largest city in Greenland was a priority for the government, followed by Kulusuk Airport in Kulusuk in south-eastern Greenland, and Ilulissat Airport in Ilulissat, the largest town in the Disko Bay region of western Greenland. This constituted the first such wave of network expansion.

Network expansion
It was not until the 1990s that the network experienced another spurt of large-scale growth, when the airports in the remaining larger towns were built: Sisimiut Airport in Sisimiut and Maniitsoq Airport in Maniitsoq in central-western Greenland, Aasiaat Airport in the Disko Bay region, Upernavik Airport in Upernavik in northwestern Greenland, and Qaarsut Airport, an airport in Qaarsut, a settlement in the Uummannaq Fjord region; the airport serving both the village and the larger town of Uummannaq, located on the rocky Uummannaq Island.

2000-onwards

The first international flights from Nuuk Airport were to Iqaluit in Nunavut, Canada. This connection was closed 13 years later, and for years afterwards international flights to Greenland were limited to Kangerlussuaq Airport in central western Greenland,  to the north of Nuuk, an airport inherited from the U.S. Air Force when the former Sondrestrom Air Base was handed over to the then home rule government on 30 September 1992.

With the airport being limited to serving small planes, the possibilities for international connections remain limited. Reopening of the connection to Iqaluit Airport was considered by Air Greenland in late 2009, but was later postponed until at least 2011. In order to compete with Icelandair, which operates services to Nuuk, Narsarsuaq, Ilulissat, and all airports on the eastern coast, Air Greenland announced opening of new connections with Iceland, linking Nuuk and Narsarsuaq with Keflavík International Airport, later restricting it to Nuuk.
Air Greenland's seasonal flights to Iqaluit in Canada finally resumed in summer 2012, but ended before summer 2015.

The Bombardier Dash 8-Q200 turboprops, acquired in Spring 2010, are the newest planes in the Air Greenland fleet, and are based at the airport.

Nuuk Airport is also home to the Beechcraft King Air B200 "Amaalik", used for air ambulance flights and occasional charters.

The airport is also used for various charter flights, such as airlifts to the summit of the  Sermitsiaq Mountain, a landmark of Nuuk, located on Sermitsiaq Island north of the airport.
The airport is also used for shuttle flights for events like the 2010 Inuit Circumpolar Council general assembly in Nuuk. and for the 2016 Arctic Winter Games. In general the short runway is a problem for large events in Nuuk. Charter and extra flights from outside Greenland can not land in Nuuk (or any other city of Greenland), so Air Greenland need to shuttle passengers between Kangerlussuaq and Nuuk, using planes much smaller than the charter planes, often requiring a hotel night in Kangerlussuaq.

Runway expansion
The airport terminal and apron are built on a levelled platform on an undulating slope under the Quassussuaq mountain, with the runway platform artificially elevated to compensate for the scarp immediately to the west. The runway platform bed is composed of broken rock and rubble, topped with gravel, and protected by a low, wooden fence. The short runway is highly problematic as established previously, as it makes the airfield unusable for even regional jet aircraft (for instance the Bombardier CRJ family), instead requiring highly-specialised STOL-capable aircraft to be used, which are both limited in size and numbers.

There is an ongoing extension project for the runway. After 2010 there are no aircraft that can be purchased, which have more than 30 seats and can use short runways like Nuuk. When the existing Dash-8 200 retire or more aircraft are needed, a longer runway is necessary.

An expansion of the runway in that direction would require relocation of the connecting road, which climbs under the runway scarp. An often-discussed extension of the runway in the other direction would have brought the endpoint close to Qinngorput, the newest district of Nuuk, rapidly expanding in the late 2000s. Also an expansion should not obstruct ongoing traffic since there is no other runway or airport reachable by road.

As a result, more flights are needed.
The extension issue has been a long-standing topic of ongoing controversy in Greenland. Rough weather in the region is cited as life-threatening to larger airplanes, given the additional difficulty of approach in a mountainous region.
Another suggested alternative was to build a new airport on one of the islands of Angisunnguaq or Qeqertarssuaq, locations having less turbulence, and allowing  runway needed for the large planes used today to Denmark. These are located a few kilometres south of Nuuk and would need a bridge or tunnel connection. Such a project could cost somewhere around 2–3 billion DKK.

In 2016 the state-owned company Kalaallit Airports A/S was formed. It shall build or rebuild (extend) the airports in Nuuk, Ilulissat and Qaqortoq, and thereafter own them. Construction start was November 2019. The time plan, which has the aim to keep traffic going, is to build the southern extension until July 2021, use it for air activities and to build the rest of the new runway and new terminal building and finish the project in 2024. Operations on the southern extension began in November 2022.

Greenland hub
Unlike Nuuk Airport, the airport in Kangerlussuaq can serve large airliners, and remains the airline hub of Air Greenland, the flag carrier of Greenland. But Kangerlussuaq has very few inhabitants and is mainly a place to change plane.

The airline argues that the infrastructure at Kangerlussuaq is good, and visibility is not hampered by the coastal fogs, storms, heavy snowfall, and frequent turbulence in particular.

Another option mentioned is to have Keflavik airport (Iceland's main international airport) as the international hub, close Kangerlussuaq, and expand Nuuk Airport runway slightly, so small jet planes can use it. (Icelandair has already built up a Greenland network from Reykjavík, Iceland)

These well-grounded arguments for preserving the status quo pose a problem for the Government of Greenland, which oversees the development of the airport network through Mittarfeqarfiit, the airport administration authority. More than a quarter of Greenland's population lives in Nuuk, with the majority of the important institutions in the country located in the city, and the need to change planes at Kangerlussuaq is costly and time-consuming for passengers, especially for groups using larger long-distance charter planes.
Cruise ship passengers need air connections, since for most of them it's too time consuming and expensive to stay onboard from Europe or USA and back. Some cruise ship go the long way to Kangerlussuaq to exchange passengers (which has no suitable port so passengers must board small boats there), and some use the feeder flights Nuuk-Kangerlussuaq which however have too little capacity for a cruise ship. They want direct charter flights. A runway expansion would support cruise ship tourism.

Facilities
Nuuk Airport has a passenger terminal, and a cargo terminal of Air Greenland. It serves as the technical base for Air Greenland. The airport is equipped with the distance measuring equipment. There are three gates in the terminal, located in the same area as the check-in desks and the waiting hall, with unrestricted access. The luggage conveyor belt is installed in a separate section of the terminal. The airport is closed on Sundays.

Airlines and destinations

Ground transport
Line 3 of Nuup Bussii connects the airport with Nuuk Centrum, passing through the Nuussuaq and Quassussuup Tungaa districts on the way. Buses depart from the airport every hour during rush hours Monday to Friday. Taxis operated by Nuna Taxa are also available. Limited-time parking for private cars is available outside the terminal.

Accidents and incidents

 On 7 June 2008, a Eurocopter AS350 operated by Air Greenland crashed on the runway at Nuuk Airport. There were no injuries, but the helicopter was damaged beyond repair.

 On 4 March 2011, an Air Iceland Dash 8's landing gear collapsed while landing on the runway. There were no injuries, but the aircraft suffered serious damage.

References

External links

 
 Official web site

Airports in Greenland
Transport in Nuuk